How We Rock was the third release from the Boston hardcore punk band SSD. It was rooted in the hardcore sound but exhibited overt heavy metal characteristics, such as a relatively high number of lengthy guitar solos.

Track listing

Side A
"Intro"
"How We Rock"
"Words That Kill"
"The Choice"

Side B
"On the Road"
"What It Takes"
"What If I"

Personnel
Springa - vocals
Al Barile - guitar
Francois Levesque - guitar
Jaime Sciarappa - bass
Chris Foley - drums

References

1984 albums
SSD (band) albums